Marko Pantić (born 18 June 1998) is a Serbian footballer who plays as a defensive midfielder for Napredak Kruševac.

Club career

Spartak Subotica
Born in Novi Sad, Pantić was a member ŽSK Žabalj, Sloga Temerin, Vojvodina and Spartak Subotica youth categories. In summer 2016, Pantić moved on one-year loan to fourth level league club Hajduk Čurug. After the first half-season he spent with the club as a bonus player in the Vojvodina League South, a loan deal was terminated and he returned to Spartak Subotica.

Next he spent the winter break off-season playing several friendly matches, Pantić promoted as a first team player of Spartak Subotica in February 2017. He made his official debut for the club in the 22 fixture match of 2016–17 Serbian SuperLiga season against Vojvodina, played on 19 February 2017 at the Subotica City Stadium. Pantić signed his first four-and-a-half year professional contract with club in March 2017. During the first half-season of the 2017–18 Serbian SuperLiga campaign, Pantić was usually used as a back-up choice under coach Aleksandar Veselinović, after which he moved on loan to ČSK Čelarevo for the rest of season. Returning to Spartak Subotica, Pantić passed the first training with the club, and following preparing period on the Zlatibor mountain. At the beginning of July 2018, Pantić mutually terminated the contract and left the club.

OFK Bačka
On 2 July 2018, Pantić moved to OFK Bačka, penning a two-year deal with new club. Pantić made his debut for the club in second fixture match of the 2018–19 Serbian SuperLiga campaign, in 2–1 victory over his ex club, Spartak Subotica.

Napredak Kruševac
In June 2021, he joined Napredak Kruševac.

International career
In March 2017, as a coach of Serbia under-19 national level, Milan Obradović called Pantić into the squad for elite qualification round of the 2017 UEFA European Under-19 Championship. He made his debut for the team in a match against Slovakia, played on 23 March 2017. He also played a full-time match against Germany, two days later.

Career statistics

References

External links
 
 
 
 

1998 births
Living people
Footballers from Novi Sad
Serbian footballers
Serbia youth international footballers
Association football midfielders
FK Spartak Subotica players
FK ČSK Čelarevo players
OFK Bačka players
FK Proleter Novi Sad players
FK Napredak Kruševac players
Serbian First League players
Serbian SuperLiga players